Ōkaburaya Shrine (大鏑矢神社, Ōkaburaya jinja) is a Shinto shrine located in Tamura, Fukushima Prefecture, Japan. It enshrines the kami Takamimusubi (高皇産霊神), Ōkaburaya no kami (大鏑矢神), and Sakanoue Tamuramaro no mikoto (坂之上田村麿命). Its main annual festival is held on November 1.

See also
List of Shinto shrines in Japan

External links
Official website

Shinto shrines in Fukushima Prefecture